Ion Ghica (12 August 1816 – 7 May 1897) was a Romanian statesman, mathematician, diplomat and politician, who was Prime Minister of Romania five times. He was a full member of the Romanian Academy and its president many times (1876–1882, 1884–1887, 1890–1893 and 1894–1895). He was the older brother and associate of Pantazi Ghica, a prolific writer and politician.

Early life and Revolution

He was born in Bucharest, Wallachia, to the prominent Ghica boyar family, and was the nephew of both Grigore Alexandru Ghica (who was to become Prince of Wallachia in the 1840s and 1850s) and Ion Câmpineanu, a Carbonari-inspired radical. His father was Dimitrie (Tache) Ghica and his mother – Maria née Câmpineanu. 
Ion Ghica was educated in Bucharest and in Western Europe, studying engineering and mathematics in Mine School of Paris (France) from 1837 to 1840.

After finishing his studies in Paris, he left for Moldavia and was involved in the failed Frăția ("Brotherhood") conspiracy of 1848, which was intended to bring about the union of Wallachia and Moldavia under one native Romanian leader, Prince Mihai Sturdza. Ion Ghica became a professor on geology and mineralogy  and later professor on political economy at the Academia Mihăileană which was founded by the same Prince Sturdza in Iași (future University of Iași). He is considered the first great Roumanian economist.

He joined the Wallachian revolutionary camp, and, in the name of the Provisional Government then established in Bucharest, went to Istanbul to approach the Ottoman Imperial government; he, Nicolae Bălcescu, and General Gheorghe Magheru were instrumental in mediating negotiations between the Transylvanian Romanian leader Avram Iancu and the Hungarian Revolutionary government of Lajos Kossuth.

Prince of Samos

While in Istanbul, he was appointed Bey (governor) of Samos (1854–1859), where he proved his leadership skills by extirpating local piracy (most of which was aimed at transports supplying the Crimean War). After completing the task, Ghica was awarded the honorary title of Bey of Samos by Sultan Abd-ul-Mejid I in 1856.

Political career in Romania

In 1859, after the union of Moldavia and Walachia had been effected, Prince Alexandru Ioan Cuza asked Ion Ghica to return. Later (1866), despite being trusted by Prince Cuza, Ghica took active part in the secret grouping that secured Cuza's overthrow. He was the first prime minister under Prince of Romania (afterwards King of Romania) Carol of Hohenzollern.

In 1866, Ghica became the first chairman of the newly established Bank of Romania. He is also noted as one of the first major Liberal figures in the Kingdom of Romania, and one of the leaders of the incipient Liberal Party. His group's radicalism, with its boyar leadership that had engineered the defunct Revolution, surfaced as republicanism whenever Carol approached the Conservatives; Ghica joined the anti-dynastic movement of 1870–1871 that had surfaced with the Republic of Ploiești. The matter of the Liberals' loyalty was ultimately settled 1876, with the exceptionally long Liberal Ministry of Ion Brătianu. In 1881, Ghica was appointed Romanian Minister in London, an office he retained until 1889; he died in Ghergani, Dâmbovița County.

Works
Beside his political distinction, Ion Ghica earned a literary reputation by writing his Letters, addressed to Vasile Alecsandri, his lifelong friend. Conceived and written during his residency in London, the letters depict the ancestral stage of Romanian society, as it appeared to be fading away.

He was also the author of Amintiri din pribegie ("Recollections from Exile"), in 1848, and of Convorbiri Economice ("Conversations on Economics"), dealing with major economic issues.  He was the first to advocate the favoring of local initiatives over foreign investments in industry and commerce – to a certain extent, this took the form of protectionism (a characteristic of the Liberal Party throughout the coming period, and until World War II).

Footnotes

References

1816 births
1897 deaths
Chairpersons of the National Theatre Bucharest
Ion
National Liberal Party (Romania) politicians
Political people from the Ottoman Empire
Politicians from Bucharest
Romanian people of the Crimean War
People of the Revolutions of 1848
Presidents of the Romanian Academy
Prime Ministers of the Principality of Wallachia
Prime Ministers of the Principality of Moldavia
Prime Ministers of Romania
Romanian Ministers of Foreign Affairs
Romanian Ministers of Interior
Ambassadors of Romania to the United Kingdom
19th-century Romanian economists
Romanian essayists
Romanian mathematicians
Romanian memoirists
Romanian revolutionaries
Romanian sociologists
Princes of Samos
19th-century rulers in Europe
19th-century memoirists